La Faloise is a commune in the Somme department in Hauts-de-France in northern France.

Geography
La Faloise station has rail connections to Amiens and Creil.

History
La Faloise grew around a 13th-century château, which was ransacked in 1358, then rebuilt early in the 15th century by the Burgundians. It was attacked by the English and taken in 1442.
The chateau returned to the Burgundians under Charles le Téméraire, on return from his defeat at Beauvais. When he died in 1477, the towns of the Somme reverted to the French crown. La Faloise was then in the hands of the Montmorency family, seigneurs of Breteuil.

In the middle of the 15th century Louis I de Bourbon married Eléonore of Roye and became seigneur of La Faloise. By the end of the century, the village had experienced much upheaval, being taken by the Ligueurs, Royalists and then the Spanish. To complete the misfortune, the population was decimated by the plague in 1668.

The French Revolution saw La Faloise rebuilt and industrialised. It became famous for the fabrication of nails. This prosperity lasted until about 1850.
The village was occupied by the Germans during the conflicts of the Franco-Prussian War of 1870, the First World War and the Second World War.
The church was burnt down in 1940 and rebuilt after the war.

Population

See also
Communes of the Somme department

References

Communes of Somme (department)